Danielle Simard (born March 12, 1952) is a Canadian writer and illustrator living in Quebec.

She was born in Montreal and studied design at the Université du Québec à Montréal. Simard worked as a graphic artist for various organizations, including Radio-Canada and a Laval school board. In 1989, she decided to dedicate herself to writing and illustrating children's books. Since 1992, she has concentrated more on writing. Simard was literary and artistic director for the Maboul collection of Quebec publishing house .

Selected works 
 C'est pas tous les jours Noël, juvenile fiction (1994), finalist for the 
 J'ai vendu ma sœu (2002), received the Governor General's Award for French-language children's literature
 Les petites folies du jeudi (2003)
 La plus méchante maman (2005)
 L'Esprit du vent, juvenile fiction (2005)

References 

1952 births
Living people
Governor General's Award-winning children's writers
Canadian children's book illustrators
Writers from Montreal
Canadian children's writers in French
Canadian women children's writers